Taosi Township is a township in Xiangfen County, Shanxi, China. It is bordered by Dadeng Township to the north, Xincheng Town to the west, Yicheng County to the east, and Quwo County to the south.

History
In the Mongolian ruling Yuan dynasty (1271–1368), it was known as "Anze Township" of Xiangling County.

In the Ming dynasty (1368–1644), it was divided into eleven Li and in the following Qing dynasty (1644–1911), it was divided into six Li.

In 1918, it belonged to the Second District of Xiangling County.

In August 1953, it became a township and was divided into seven villages. In March 1956, Anli Township was merged into the township. In October 1958, it was renamed "Dongfeng People's Commune". In February 1984, it restored its former name as "Taosi Township".

Collapse of Juxian Restaurant 

At around 9:40 a.m. on August 29, 2020, Juxian Restaurant, a restaurant located in Chenzhuang Village, collapsed, resulting in 29 deaths.

Administrative divisions
As of 2017, the township is divided into 20 villages: 
 Changyuan 
 Taosi 
 Lizhuang 
 Zhongliang 
 Dongpogou 
 Liujia 
 Xiaoliang 
 Wangyun 
 Xingguang 
 Beizhang 
 Anli 
 Chenzhuang 
 Zhangxiang 
 Zhangzai 
 Chongshi 
 Yunhe 
 Jiashaxiang 
 Cuijiazhuang 
 Pandao 
 Qingyang

Geography

There is a large temperature difference between day and night. It is dry and windy in the spring, humid and hot in the summer, frost in the early autumn, and dry and cold in the winter.

Demographics 
Taosi Township has a hukou population of 22,804 as of 2018.

In the 2010 Chinese Census, Taosi Township had a population of 19,723.

In 2008 Taosi Township had a population of 23,141.

In the 2000 Chinese Census, Taosi Township had a population of 26,139.

Economy

The local economy is primarily based upon agriculture and industry. The township is rich in gold, iron and gypsum.

The main fruit grown in Taosi Township is jujube, and the main livestock is chicken.

Attractions
Taosi is an archaeological site in the township. The earliest evidence of writing in China was found here which is 800 years before the oracle bone inscriptions of the Shang Dynasty.

References

Divisions of Xiangfen County